The Probert-Price Collection is a collection of items from the Probert-Price estate, primarily hundreds of vintage dresses which belonged to Renee Probert-Price, original It girl and well-known London socialite of her time (1917-2013). Renee left over 300 dresses, hats, furs, shoes and handbags dating from the 1930s and 1980s to her great niece and goddaughter.

Renee Probert-Price

Little is known of Probert-Price’s early life, but she was rumoured to be an illegitimate daughter of a lord, a dealer of precious stones, or a tinned fruit merchant. Her mother, Florence May, was a well-known singer and Gaiety Girl on the London stage.

Following in her mother’s footsteps, Renee embarked on a career in London’s West End theatres and nightclubs, during which time she appears to have used a variety of stage names. Starting as a professional dancer as a young girl, Renee then became a Tiller Girl at the London Palladium and was also associated with the Windmill Girls.

During her time managing the Club Panama Theatre in Soho she met Douglas Probert-Price, her future husband, in a drug bust. Douglas, a detective at Scotland Yard, was the first commoner to become a barrister, and was once bodyguard to the actress Elizabeth Taylor.

Once married, Douglas moved into the large town house where his wife had been raised by her mother in the South London suburb of Streatham. Renee enjoyed a very varied and glamorous social life, and was friends with an assortment of famous figures, including childhood friend and fellow Streatham resident, designer Norman Hartnell.

Probert-Price lived as a recluse for the last 30 years of her life, especially after her husband’s death in 2000.

In 2014, the story of Renee Probert-Price was being documented by her great-niece and goddaughter, with an independent film, book and exhibition in development.

The collection

Probert-Price built up a vast and exclusive collection of dresses over the decades, which were left to her great-niece and goddaughter following her death in 2013. There are over 360 dresses in the collection, with the particularly striking dresses collected between 1955-1965.

The collection includes garments by over 140 designers and retailers, including Norman Hartnell, Christian Dior, Harvey Nicholls, Gina, Bourne and Hollingsworth, Frank Usher, Harrods and Liberty of London. Most of the dresses have London labels, or were designed by Renee herself and made in London by her personal dressmaker. An example of Hartnell’s work within the collection is an ensemble previously exhibited in the Victoria and Albert Museum.

References

Private collections in the United Kingdom
Fashion museums in the United Kingdom
Dresses